A peplum jacket is a jacket with a short overskirt known as a peplum attached. Peplum jackets experienced a revival as a fashion trend in 2012.

References 

Jackets